The Edict of Roussillon was a 1564 edict decreeing that the year would begin on 1 January in France.

During a trip to various parts of his kingdom, the King of France, Charles IX, found that depending on the diocese, the year began either at Christmas (at Lyon, for instance) or on 25 March (as at Vienne), on 1 March, or at Easter.

In order to standardise the date for the new year in the entire kingdom, he added an article to an edict given at Paris in January 1563 which he promulgated at Roussillon on 9 August 1564. It started being applied on 1 January 1567.

The 42 articles that comprised this edict concerned justice, except the last four, added during the king's stay at Roussillon.

It was article 39 that announced a 1 January start date for every year henceforth.

List of regions

References
Dictionnaire Historique de la France, by Ludovic Lalanne, p. 84, vol. 1, 1877, Reprinted by Burt Franklin, New York, 1968.
The New American Cyclopaedia: A Popular Dictionary of General Knowledge, p. 493, ed. George Ripley, Charles A. Dana. D. Appleton and Company, 1858.
Le calendrier grégorien en France by Rodolphe Audette

1564 in France
Roussillon
Charles IX of France
Calendars
New Year celebrations
1564 in law